The 1940 United States Senate election in Pennsylvania was held on November 5, 1940. Incumbent Democratic U.S. Senator Joseph F. Guffey successfully sought re-election to another term, defeating the Republican nominee, Jay Cooke. 

As of 2022, this is the last time that Mifflin County and Montour County voted Democratic in a Senate election. This was also the last time until 1991 that Democrats won this Senate seat, and the last until 2006 that they were elected to this seat for a full term.

General election

Candidates
Joseph F. Guffey, incumbent U.S. Senator (Democratic)
Jay Cooke (Republican)

Results

|-
|-bgcolor="#EEEEEE"
| colspan="3" align="right" | Totals
| align="right" | 3,997,020
| align="right" | 100.00%
| align="right" | 
|}

References

1940
Pennsylvania
United States Senate